Lamotte-Beuvron is a railway station in Lamotte-Beuvron, Centre-Val de Loire, France. The station opened on 20 July 1847 and is located on the Orléans–Montauban railway line. The station is served by regional services (TER Centre-Val de Loire) to Vierzon and Orléans. The station and its surroundings were renovated in 2018–2019. It sees 190,000 passengers a year.

References

Railway stations in Loir-et-Cher
Railway stations in France opened in 1847